Tamar Shedania (born 31 January 1992) is a Georgian model and beauty pageant titleholder who represented her country in the Miss Universe 2012 and Miss World 2013 pageants.

Early life
Tamar Shedania competed in International Elite Model Look contest in 2007. In her professional life and spare time, she loves to travel where she can learn about different cultures and people. 

Her vital statistics are: 32 – 23.5 – 34.5 inches.

Pageantry 
Tamar Shedania has been crowned Miss Georgia 2012 at the 10th edition of Miss Georgia beauty contest at the Rabati Castle in Akhaltsikhe on 26 September 2012. Shedania represented Georgia in Miss Universe 2012. Although considered a big favorite and a front runner, she failed to place in the Top 16. She also represented Georgia in Miss World 2013, but failed to place in the Top 20 Semi-Finalists.

References

External links
 Miss Georgia official website

1992 births
Living people
Beauty pageant winners from Georgia (country)
Miss World 2013 delegates
Miss Universe 2012 contestants
Models from Tbilisi
Miss Georgia (country) winners